Robert Baan (born 1 April 1943) is a Dutch football coach, appointed to the role of Technical Director for the India national team by the AIFF. He was the Technical Director of All India Football Federation.

Biography
Baan was born in Rotterdam, South Holland.  Before joining the Indian team, he served the technical director role for the Netherlands, Feyenoord Rotterdam and ADO Den Haag.

While Graham Arnold was the caretaker coach for the Socceroos, Baan, alongside his Technical Director duties, was also briefly the caretaker coach for the Australia Under 23 team.
He was briefly appointed as a caretaker manager for the Netherlands for a 3–0 win over Cyprus in February 1981, and for Australia in 2007 for a 1–0 victory at Craven Cottage against Nigeria.

He announced his retirement from his job as technical director of Australian football and his position has been replaced by Han Berger.

References

External links 
 Netherlands Football profile 

1943 births
Living people
Dutch football managers
Dutch expatriate football managers
Feyenoord non-playing staff
Excelsior Rotterdam managers
Sparta Rotterdam managers
SC Cambuur managers
Roda JC Kerkrade managers
VVV-Venlo managers
Australia national soccer team managers
Netherlands national football team managers
FC Twente managers
ADO Den Haag managers